Aaron Monroe "Mac" McCreary (September 15, 1892 – November 5, 1984) was an American football, basketball, and baseball player, coach, and college athletics administrator. He served as the head football coach at Tempe State Teachers College—known at Arizona State Teachers College by 1929 and now called Arizona State University—compiling a career college football record of 25–17–4. McCreary was also the head basketball coach at Tempe/Arizona State Teachers from 1923 to 1930 and at Arizona State Teacher's College of Flagstaff—now known as Northern Arizona University—amassing a career college basketball record of 140–149. In addition, he coached baseball at Tempe/Arizona State Teachers (1924–1926, 1928, 1930–1931) and at Arizona State Teacher's Flagstaff. McCreary also coached track, skiing, and boxing, and assisted in football at Arizona State Teacher's Flagstaff before retiring in 1963. He is a member of the Northern Arizona University Athletics Hall of Fame.

McCreary letter in baseball, basketball, and track at Turlock High School in Turlock, California before graduating in 1913. He played football, basketball, and baseball at Arizona State, known as Tempe Normal College when he starred on the football team as a back in 1914. He earned a teaching diploma in 1915 from Tempe Normal and then enrolled at Pennsylvania College–now known as Gettysburg College—Gettysburg, Pennsylvania. McCreary joined the United States Army in 1917 and served overseas in World War I. After the war, he attended the University of Arizona and earned a bachelor of science degree in 1920.

McCreary died on November 5, 1984, in Festus, Missouri.

Head coaching record

Football

References

1892 births
1984 deaths
American men's basketball players
Arizona State Sun Devils athletic directors
Arizona State Sun Devils baseball coaches
Arizona State Sun Devils baseball players
Arizona State Sun Devils football coaches
Arizona State Sun Devils football players
Arizona State Sun Devils men's basketball coaches
Arizona State Sun Devils men's basketball players
College boxing coaches in the United States
Northern Arizona Lumberjacks athletic directors
Northern Arizona Lumberjacks baseball coaches
Northern Arizona Lumberjacks football coaches
Northern Arizona Lumberjacks men's basketball coaches
College track and field coaches in the United States
Gettysburg College alumni
University of Arizona alumni
United States Army personnel of World War I
People from Turlock, California
Sportspeople from Riverside County, California
Coaches of American football from California
Players of American football from California
Baseball coaches from California
Baseball players from California
Basketball coaches from California
Basketball players from California
Military personnel from California